The 1960 Valdivia earthquake and tsunami or the Great Chilean earthquake (Gran terremoto de Chile) on 22 May 1960 was the most powerful earthquake ever recorded. Various studies have placed it at 9.4–9.6 on the moment magnitude scale. It occurred in the afternoon (19:11 GMT, 15:11 local time), and lasted for approximately 10 minutes. The resulting tsunamis affected southern Chile, Hawaii, Japan, the Philippines, eastern New Zealand, southeast Australia, and the Aleutian Islands.

The death toll and monetary losses arising from this widespread disaster are not certain.
Various estimates of the total number of fatalities from the earthquake and tsunamis have been published, ranging between 1,000 and 6,000 killed. Different sources have estimated the monetary cost ranged from 400 million to $800 million (or $4.01 billion to $8.021 billion  in 2022, adjusted for inflation).

Earthquake sequence

Concepción earthquakes

The 1960 Chilean earthquakes were a sequence of strong earthquakes that affected Chile between 21 May and 6 June 1960, centered in the Araucanía, Aysén, and Bío Bío regions of the country. The first three quakes, all registering in the planet's top 10 by magnitude for 1960, are grouped together as the 1960 Concepción earthquakes. Its epicenter was near Curanilahue. Telecommunications to southern Chile were cut off and President Jorge Alessandri cancelled the traditional ceremony of the Battle of Iquique memorial holiday to oversee the emergency assistance efforts. The second and third Concepción earthquakes occurred the next day at  (7.1 Mw) and  (7.8 Mw) on 22 May. These earthquakes formed a southward migrating foreshock sequence to the main Valdivia shock, which occurred just 15 minutes after the third event.

The earthquake interrupted and effectively ended Lota's coal miners' march on Concepción as they demanded higher salaries.

Valdivia earthquake

Coastal villages, such as Toltén, were struck. At Corral, the main port of Valdivia, the water level rose  before it began to recede. At 16:20 UTC-4, a wave of  struck the Chilean coast, mainly between Concepción and Chiloé.

Hundreds of people were already reported dead by the time the tsunami struck. One ship, Canelos, starting at the mouth of the Valdivia River, sank after being moved  backward and forward in the river; as of 2005, its mast was still visible from the road to Niebla.

Soil subsidence also destroyed buildings, deepened local rivers and created wetlands in such places as the Río Cruces and Chorocomayo, a new aquatic park north of the city. Extensive areas of the city were flooded. The electricity and water systems of Valdivia were totally destroyed. Witnesses reported underground water flowing up through the soil. Despite the heavy rains of 21 May, the city was without a water supply. The river turned brown with sediment from landslides and was full of floating debris, including entire houses. The lack of potable water became a serious problem in one of Chile's rainiest regions.

The earthquake did not strike all the territory with the same strength; measured with the Mercalli scale, tectonically depressed areas suffered heavier damage. The two most affected areas were Valdivia and Puerto Octay, near the northwest corner of Llanquihue Lake. Puerto Octay was the center of a north–south elliptical area in the Central Valley, where the intensity was at the highest outside the Valdivia Basin. East of Puerto Octay, in a hotel in Todos los Santos Lake, stacked dishes were reported to have remained in place. Excepting poor building sites, the zone of Mercalli scales intensities of VII or more all lay west of the Andes in a strip running from Lota (37° S) southwards. The area of intensities of VII or more did not penetrate into the Central Valley north of Lleulleu Lake (38° S) and south of Castro (42.5° S).

Two days after the earthquake Cordón Caulle, a volcanic vent close to Puyehue volcano, erupted. Other volcanoes may also have erupted, but none were recorded because of the lack of communication in Chile at the time. The relatively low death toll in Chile (5,700) is explained in part by the low population density in the region, and by building practices that took into account the area's high geological activity.

Aftershocks
One of the main aftershocks occurred on 6 June in Aysén Region. This magnitude 7.7 earthquake probably occurred along the Liquiñe-Ofqui Fault, meaning that the fault would have moved as a consequence of the 22 May Valdivia earthquake.

Tectonic interpretation

The earthquake was a megathrust earthquake resulting from the release of mechanical stress between the subducting Nazca Plate and the South American Plate, on the Peru–Chile Trench.

A recent 2019 research paper postulates that the Liquiñe-Ofqui fault had a 9.07 strike-slip subevent along with the main 9.37 main thrust sub-event which could help account for how the plate boundary event seemingly "over spent" its tectonic budget. In other words, the previous and current more widely accepted explanation for the earthquake involves the Peru-Chile Trench slipping further than its accumulated slip deficit (the amount of slip available for an earthquake) should allow. The alternative explanation, with two faults slipping nearly simultaneously, could help explain the true mechanism of the earthquake.

Subduction zones are known to produce the strongest earthquakes on earth, as their particular structure allows more stress to build up before energy is released. Geophysicists consider it a matter of time before this earthquake will be surpassed in magnitude by another.

While the Valdivia earthquake was extraordinarily large, the 2016 Chiloé earthquake hints that it did not release all the potential slip in that segment of the plate interface.

Natural disasters

Tsunamis

Earthquake-induced tsunamis affected southern Chile, Hawaii, Japan, the Philippines, China, eastern New Zealand, southeast Australia, and the Aleutian Islands. The main tsunami crossed the Pacific Ocean at a speed of several hundred km/h and devastated Hilo, Hawaii, killing 61 people. Most of the tsunami-related deaths in Japan occurred in the northeast Sanriku region of Honshu.

The Chilean coast was devastated by a tsunami from Mocha Island (38° S) to Aysén Region (45° S). Across southern Chile, the tsunami caused huge loss of life, damage to port infrastructure, and the loss of many small boats. Further north, the port of Talcahuano did not suffer any major damage, only some flooding. Some tugboats and small sailboats were stranded on Rocuant Island near Talcahuano.

After the 21 May Concepción earthquake, people in Ancud sought refuge in boats. A carabinero (police) boat, Gloria, was towing a few of these boats when the second earthquake struck on 22 May. As the sea regressed Gloria became stranded between Cerro Guaiguén and Cochinos Island. The stranded boat was wrecked when a tsunami wave engulfed it.

All the new infrastructure of the small port of Bahía Mansa was destroyed by the tsunami, which reached heights of up to 10 metres above sea level there. The boat Isabella in Bahía Mansa quickly left the port but lost its anchors.

In the Valdivia River and Corral Bay, several vessels were wrecked by the earthquake, among them Argentina, Canelos, Carlos Haverbeck, Melita, and the salvaged remnants of Penco. Canelos was anchored at Corral when the quake struck, filling a cargo of wood and other products destined for northern Chile. The engine of Canelos was warmed up after the earthquake. After hours of drifting around in Corral Bay and Valdivia River, the ship was wrecked and subsequently abandoned by its crew at 1800 local time. Two men on board Canelos died in the incident. As of 2000, the remnants of Canelos were still visible.

Santiago, another ship anchored at Corral at the time of the quake, managed to leave Corral in a bad state but was wrecked off the coast of Mocha Island on 24 May. The schooner La Milagrosa departed from Queule on 22 May to load a cargo of Fitzroya wood shingles in a small port south of Corral. La Milagrosa was battered by the currents and waves of the tsunami for four days while moving south. Outside Corral the crew rescued six nearly unconscious and dehydrated children on board two boats. The boats found were used to navigate in Valdivia River and Corral Bay but had drifted into the high sea.

At the coastal town of Queule, a carabinero reported hundreds of people dead or missing some days after the tsunami. Historians Yoselin Jaramillo and Ismael Basso report that people in Queule decades later know about 50 people to have died because of the earthquake and tsunami.

Landslides

The earthquake triggered numerous landslides, mainly in the steep glacial valleys of the southern Andes. Within the Andes, most landslides occurred on forested mountain slopes around the Liquiñe-Ofqui Fault. Some of these areas remain sparsely vegetated while others have naturally developed more or less pure stands of Nothofagus dombeyi. These landslides did not cause many fatalities nor significant economic losses because most of the areas were uninhabited, with only minor roads.

One landslide caused destruction and alarm following its blockage of the outflow of Riñihue Lake (see below). The Golgol landslides destroyed parts of international Route 215-CH, which connects to Bariloche in Argentina through Cardenal Antonio Samoré Pass.

While most landslides clustered around north–south strips in the Andes, other areas that were affected by large numbers of landslides were the coast, mainly the foot of the Chilean Coast Range, and the shores of Llanquihue Lake.

Seiches
A seiche of more than 1 meter was observed on Panguipulli Lake following the earthquake. On 22 May, a seiche occurred also in Nahuel Huapi Lake, on the Argentine side of the Andes, more than 200 km away from Valdivia. The wave, most likely produced by an earthquake-triggered sediment slide at the lake bottom, killed two people and destroyed a pier in San Carlos de Bariloche city.

Riñihue Lake's flood

During the Great Chilean earthquake, several landslides west of Tralcán Mountain blocked the outflow of Riñihue Lake. Riñihue Lake is the lowest of the Seven Lakes chain and receives a constant inflow from the Enco River. The blocked San Pedro River, which drains the lake, passes through several towns before reaching the city of Valdivia near the coast.

As the San Pedro River was blocked, the water level of Riñihue Lake started to rise quickly. This potential disaster would have violently flooded all the settlements along the course of the river in less than five hours, with more dire consequences if the dam suddenly broke.

About 100,000 people lived in the affected zone. Plans were made to evacuate Valdivia, and many people left. To avoid the destruction of the city, several military units and hundreds of workers from ENDESA, CORFO, and MOP started an effort to control the lake. Twenty-seven bulldozers were put into service, but they had severe difficulties moving in the mud near the dams, so dykes had to be constructed with shovels from June onwards. The work was not restricted to the lake; drainages from other parts of the Seven Lakes were dammed to minimize additional flow into Riñihue Lake. These dams were removed later, with the exception of Calafquén Lake, which still retains its dam.

The team was led by ENDESA engineer Raúl Sáez.

Cordón Caulle eruption

On 24 May 38 hours after the main shock of the 1960 Valdivia earthquake, the Cordón Caulle volcano erupted. The eruption was believed to have been triggered by the earthquake. Between two sparsely populated and isolated Andean valleys, the eruption had few eyewitnesses and received little attention by local media, which was preoccupied with the severe and widespread damage and losses caused by the earthquake. The eruption was first noticed and reported as an explosion by the crew of a United States Air Force plane that was heading to Santiago from Puerto Montt.

The eruption fed a 5.5 km-long fissure on 135° heading where 21 individual vents have been found. These vents produced an output of about 0.25 km3 DRE both in form of lava flows and tephra. The eruption ended on 22 July 59 days later.

As a result of an evacuation plan, there were no reported human deaths associated with the eruption.

Consequences and response

Urban impact

The levels of material damage were relatively low given the high magnitude of the earthquake. Part of the reason behind this was the limited infrastructure development of the region next to the rupture zone. Structures that had been designed to resist earthquakes performed well during the earthquake, chiefly suffering damage when affected by soil subsidence or small fault movements. Houses built by their owners fared badly. In the regions of Maule and Bío Bío, houses built from adobe and masonry proved weak, while from Araucanía to the south weak houses were mainly those built with inappropriate wood that had decayed over time.

It has been estimated that about 40 percent of the houses in Valdivia were destroyed, leaving 20,000 people homeless. The most affected structures were those built of concrete, which in some cases collapsed completely, because they were not built using modern earthquake engineering. Traditional wooden houses fared better; although many were uninhabitable if they did not collapse.  Houses built upon elevated areas suffered considerably less damage compared to those on the lowlands, which absorbed great amounts of energy. Many city blocks with destroyed buildings in the city center remained empty until the 1990s and 2000s, with some of them still used as parking lots. Before the earthquake, some of these blocks had modern concrete buildings built after the Great Valdivia fire of 1909.

Valdivia's bridges suffered only minor damage. Land subsidence in Corral Bay improved navigability as shoal banks, produced earlier by sediments from Madre de Dios and other nearby gold mines, sank and were compacted. As the earthquake destroyed Valdivia's flood barriers, general land subsidence exposed new areas to flooding. Parts of the botanical garden of the Austral University of Chile that were next to Cau-Cau River and the city's southern outskirts along Route 206 were permanently flooded.

The United States quickly set up a field hospital following the earthquake. Aided by the United States, a geological survey of Valdivia was done following the earthquake and resulted in the city's first geological map. Mexico built and donated the public school Escuela México after the earthquake.

The earthquakes damaged an area that had suffered a long period of economic decline, which began with shifts in trade routes due to the expansion of railroads in southern Chile and the opening of the Panama Canal in 1914.

Unlike Valdivia, Osorno was saved from major destruction. In Osorno only about 20 houses were totally destroyed, although many firewalls and chimneys collapsed.

Puerto Montt, a major city today, had in the early 1960s about 49,500 inhabitants. The bulk of the damage in Puerto Montt was located in the neighborhood of Barrio Modelo and the northern part of Bahía Angelmó, where artificial fills subsided. Angelmó and other coastal areas of Puerto Montt were among the few urban areas that suffered "total destruction" by the earthquake.

Impact in the countryside

The tsunami that struck the coast of southern Chile destroyed seaside farms, killing numerous livestock and people. Barns and industrial structures were destroyed by the quake. The dairy industry was among the few industries of the affected zone that received subsidies and investment after the earthquake. It received state support through a long-term policy after the earthquake.

As a result of the earthquake, an international technological cooperation programme was established in the dairy sector. More specifically, the German and Danish governments helped to create the Centro Tecnológico de la Leche (the Milk Technological Centre) in the Southern University of Chile. The scholar Erik Dahmén believes that the earthquake resulted in a "creative destruction" for farmers of Southern Chile.

A large area of former pastures and cultivated fields around the lower course of Cruces River was permanently flooded as a result of c. 2 m of subsidence caused by the earthquake. Over the years the new wetlands were colonized chiefly by Egeria densa. Egeria densa and other plants created a rich aquatic ecosystem that attracted a permanent bird fauna, notably black-necked swans. The protected area of Carlos Anwandter Nature Sanctuary was created in 1981 to protect the ecosystem.

The economy of the coastal town of Queule had during the 1950s developed significantly. Its economy based on fishing, agriculture and industry had grown. Queule was connected by road in 1957 to the rest of the country and the town had developed into a balneario. This era of prosperity ended with the 1960 earthquake.

Further north the earthquake destroyed numerous houses in the coal-mining town of Lebu.

Creation of emergency committee

After the 1960 Valdivia earthquake, a committee was formed to solve problems caused by the earthquake. It continued to operate, to develop approaches for national emergencies. In 1974, after the 1971 eruption of Villarrica volcano, the committee was officially founded as ONEMI (Spanish acronym for Ministry of Interior National Emergency Office) when it was authorized by law as an independent governmental office.

Human sacrifice
In the coastal village Collileufu (La Araucanía Region), native Lafkenches carried out a human sacrifice during the days following the main earthquake. Collileufu is located in the Budi Lake area, south of Puerto Saavedra, which was highly isolated in 1960. The Mapuche spoke primarily Mapudungun. The community had gathered in Cerro La Mesa, while the lowlands were struck by successive tsunamis. Juana Namuncura Añen, a local machi, demanded the sacrifice of the grandson of Juan Painecur, a neighbor, in order to calm the earth and the ocean. The victim was 5-year-old José Luis Painecur, an "orphan" (huacho) whose mother had gone to work as a domestic worker in Santiago and left her son under the care of his father.

The sacrifice was learned about by authorities after a boy in the commune of Nueva Imperial denounced to local leaders the theft of two horses; these were allegedly eaten during the sacrifice ritual. Two men were charged with the crime of murder and confessed, but later recanted. They were released from prison after two years. A judge ruled that those involved had "acted without free will, driven by an irresistible natural force of ancestral tradition". The story was mentioned in a Time magazine article, although with little detail.

Previous and subsequent earthquakes 
An earthquake of similar magnitude occurred in this area around 1800 BC, as has been determined by dating charcoal and shells washed into the Atacama Desert by the tsunami. This apparently caused the hunter-gatherers of the area to stop living near the coast for the next thousand years or so.

There is evidence that a similar earthquake and landslide occurred in 1575 in Valdivia. This earthquake was of similar strength and also caused a Riñihuazo. According to the chronicle of Mariño de Lobera, corregidor of Valdivia in 1575, a landslide blocked the outflow of the lagoon of Renigua. Several months later in April, it caused a flood. He said that the Spanish settlers had evacuated and waited on high ground until after the dam burst, but many aboriginals died in the flood waters. While the 1575 earthquake is considered the one most similar to that of 1960, it differed in not having caused any tsunami in Japan.

Other lesser earthquakes that preceded the 1960 event occurred in 1737 and 1837.

On 27 February 2010 at 03:34 local time, an 8.8 magnitude earthquake occurred just to the north (off the coast of the Maule region of Chile, between Concepción and Santiago). It may have been related or consequential to the 1960 Valdivia quake, the strongest as recorded using modern technology. This 2010 earthquake was the largest to affect Valdivia since the 1960 event. 35 houses were severely damaged and some 44 other suffered reparable damages. A survey showed that 434 persons in Valdivia had their homes damaged by the earthquake. The damages were to areas of poor soil quality, chiefly former wetlands and artificial fills. Some pavements near the rivershore in Valdivia cracked and collapsed much like in the 1960 earthquake. Over-all the 2010 damages in Valdivia were few and highly localized.

See also

 1964 Villarrica eruption
 Geology of Chile
 Great Chilean drought of 1968–1969
 List of earthquakes in 1960
 List of earthquakes in Chile
 List of largest earthquakes by magnitude
 List of megathrust earthquakes

References

Bibliography

External links

 Chilean earthquake and tsunami – University of Washington
 Tsunami of 1960 – George Pararas-Carayannis
 Hawaii Events – Pacific Disaster Center
 22 May 1960 South Central Chile Tsunami Amplitudes – National Oceanic and Atmospheric Administration
 The Largest Earthquake in the World – United States Geological Survey
 

Megathrust earthquakes in Chile
Valdivia earthquake
Valdivia earthquake
History of Los Ríos Region
Floods in Chile
Valdivia
Tsunamis in Chile
Tsunamis in Japan
Tsunamis in the United States
Valdivia earthquake
Tsunamis in New Zealand
Valdivia earthquake
May 1960 events in South America
Presidency of Jorge Alessandri